Ravelli is a surname of Italian origin. Notable people with the surname include:

 Andreas Ravelli (born 1959), Swedish footballer
 Diego Giovanni Ravelli (born 1965), Italian priest
 Louise Ravelli (born 1963), Australian linguist
 Thomas Ravelli (born 1959), Swedish footballer

Fictional characters
 Emmanuel Ravelli, a character played by Chico Marx

Italian-language surnames